Moira Simmons-Avafoa is a climate-change activist and civil servant from Tuvalu.

Career 
Simmons-Avafoa is outspoken about the effects of climate change - particularly on the lives of women and children, who also have the least input into decision-making. She was a Senior Advisor - Pacific Division with the Ministry of Foreign Affairs in Tuvalu until a secondment to the Pacific Islands Forum Secretariat as part of the Smaller Island States Attachment Programme. In 2019 she had returned to her Senior Adviser role.

In 2018 she was the programme's representative at the Green Climate Fund's Structured Dialogue with the Pacific conference. In 2017 she was one of 22 women selected to take part in an international climate-change negotiation training workshop. The workshop was entitled Pacific Women's Climate Change Negotiating Conference and was facilitated by the Pacific Islands Forum and the Australian Government.

References

External links 
 Moira Simmons-Avafoa

Date of birth missing (living people)
Tuvaluan activists
Tuvaluan women in politics
Tuvaluan women
Living people
Year of birth missing (living people)